Stepan Shukhevych (1 January 1877 – 6 June 1945) was a Ukrainian lawyer and military figure.

Born in Serafanivka, near Horodenka, Kingdom of Galicia and Lodomeria, he was the son of a Greek Catholic priest. He completed school at the Academic Gymnasium in Lviv, and then the Faculty of Law at the Lviv University. With the commencement of World War I, he took part in the formation of the Ukrainian Sich Riflemen (USS) as an otaman (equivalent to a major). From 1914 to 1916 he had a number of commands in the Legion (USS), and then (1918–1919) in the Ukrainian Galician Army (UHA). Commandant of Odessa in 1918. After the war he returned to his legal practice. From 1921 to 1925 he was a professor of criminal law at the Lviv University, and took the cases in defense of Ukrainians who were arrested and charged by the Polish government in anti-Polish activities. Shukhevych was one of the organizers of the "Chervona kalyna" publishing house, publishing materials about the history of the Ukrainian War of Independence.

At the commencement of World War II, he moved to Crakow, where he continued his legal practice until his death in Amberg, Germany. Author of a number of memoirs about the history of the anti-Polish movement in Galicia, he was the uncle of Roman Shukhevych and nephew of Volodymyr Shukhevych.

Sources
 (In Russian) Chuyev, Sergei - Ukrainskyj Legion -  Moscow, 2006

1877 births
1945 deaths
People from Ivano-Frankivsk Oblast
People from the Kingdom of Galicia and Lodomeria
Ukrainian Eastern Catholics
Ukrainian collaborators with Nazi Germany
Ukrainian people of World War I
Austro-Hungarian military personnel of World War I
Ukrainian people of the Polish–Ukrainian War
Organization of Ukrainian Nationalists
Stepan
Austro-Hungarian lawyers